Ellen Crosby Roosevelt (August 20, 1868  – September 26, 1954) was an American tennis player.

She was the daughter of John Aspinwall Roosevelt, an estate proprietor, and Ellen Murray Crosby. She started playing tennis with her sister Grace in 1879 when her father installed a tennis court at their mansion.

She won the women's singles title at the 1890 U.S. Championships defeating the 1888 and 1889 champion Bertha Townsend in the final in two sets. The same year, she won the doubles title with her sister. They were the first pair of sisters to win the U.S. Championships and remained the only pair to do so until the Williams sisters equalled their achievement in 1999.  At the 1893 U.S. Championships, she won the mixed doubles title with Oliver Campbell.
 
She was a first cousin of Franklin D. Roosevelt, and she was inducted into the International Tennis Hall of Fame in 1975.

Grand Slam finals

Singles (1 title)

Doubles (1 title)

Mixed doubles (1 title)

References

External links 
 

1868 births
1954 deaths
19th-century American people
19th-century female tennis players
American female tennis players
American people of Dutch descent
People from Hyde Park, New York
Ellen
International Tennis Hall of Fame inductees
Tennis people from New York (state)
United States National champions (tennis)
Grand Slam (tennis) champions in women's singles
Grand Slam (tennis) champions in women's doubles
Grand Slam (tennis) champions in mixed doubles